The second season of the American television drama series Homeland premiered on September 30, 2012 on Showtime and concluded on December 16, 2012, consisting of 12 episodes. The series is loosely based on the Israeli television series Hatufim (English: Prisoners of War) created by Gideon Raff and is developed for American television by Howard Gordon and Alex Gansa.

Set in the aftermath of Season 1, Carrie Mathison is now on leave from the CIA. However, she is recruited for an operation in Beirut by mentor Saul Berenson, resulting in their securing of conclusive proof that Nicholas Brody has been turned by al-Qaeda and is working against the United States. All the while, Brody becomes closer and closer to the Vice President as he enters into politics.

Cast and characters

Main

 Claire Danes as Carrie Mathison, a CIA intelligence officer assigned to the Counterterrorism Center
 Damian Lewis as Nicholas Brody, a U.S. Marine  Sergeant and a Marine Scout Sniper who was rescued by Delta Force after being held by al-Qaeda as a prisoner of war for eight years
 Morena Baccarin as Jessica Brody, Nicholas Brody's wife
 David Harewood as David Estes, the Director of the CIA's Counterterrorism Center and Carrie's boss
 Diego Klattenhoff as Mike Faber, a U.S. Marine Major (formerly Captain). He was Nicholas' best friend who, assuming Nicholas was dead, began an affair with his wife, Jessica Brody.
 Jamey Sheridan as William Walden, Vice President of the United States and former director of the CIA
 David Marciano as Virgil, Carrie's contact aiding in the surveillance of Brody
 Navid Negahban as Abu Nazir, a high-ranking member of al-Qaeda
 Jackson Pace as Chris Brody, Nicholas Brody's son
 Morgan Saylor as Dana Brody, Nicholas Brody's daughter
 Mandy Patinkin as Saul Berenson, the CIA's Middle-East Division Chief and Carrie's old boss and mentor

Recurring
 Hrach Titizian as Danny Galvez, a CIA agent of Guatemalan and Lebanese origin
 Zuleikha Robinson as Roya Hammad, a journalist and Nazir's contact
 Valerie Cruz as Major Joy Mendez
 Timothée Chalamet as Finn Walden, son of the Vice President and Dana's romantic interest
 Talia Balsam as Cynthia Walden, wife of the Vice President
 Marc Menchaca as Lauder Wakefield, a former Marine
 Maury Sterling as Max Piotrowski, Virgil's brother who also aids in the surveillance of Brody
 Rupert Friend as Peter Quinn, a CIA analyst
 Mido Hamada as M.M.

Guest

 Amy Hargreaves as Maggie Mathison, Carrie's sister and a psychiatrist
 James Rebhorn as Frank Mathison, Carrie's father
 Clara Khoury as Fatima Ali
 Tim Guinee as Scott Ryan
 Larry Pine as Richard Halsted
 Nasser Faris as Bassel "The Tailor"
 Seth Gilliam as Chapman
 Marin Ireland as Aileen Morgan, an imprisoned anti-American terrorist
 John Finn as Rex Henning
 Victor Slezak as Warden Jack Prithard
 F. Murray Abraham as Dar Adal, a retired black ops specialist
 Daniella Pineda as Julia Diaz
 James Urbaniak as Larry
 Chance Kelly as Mitchell Clawson
 Sarita Choudhury as Mira Berenson, Saul's wife who is often out of the country.
 Billy Smith as Special Agent Hall
 John Cariani as Jeff Ricker

Episodes

Production
Showtime renewed the series for a second season of 12 episodes on October 26, 2011. 

Production for the season began in May 2012, with the first two episodes being filmed in Israel, which doubles as Beirut, where the episodes take place. 

The second season has three season one recurring actors–David Marciano, Navid Negahban, and Jamey Sheridan–being promoted to series regulars. Actor Rupert Friend joined the cast playing Peter Quinn, a CIA analyst; he was originally reported to be a series regular, but he is credited as a guest star.

Reception

Reviews 
On Rotten Tomatoes, the season has an approval rating of 93% with an average score of 8.6 out of 10 based on 42 reviews. The website's critical consensus reads, "Homeland is proving itself one of the best thrillers on television, as its second season ratchets up the tension and benefits from increased chemistry between its stars." The second season of Homeland scored a Metacritic rating of 96 out of 100 based on 21 reviews.  Based on aggregation of television critics' top-ten lists, the season was ranked as the second best television show of 2012 by HitFix, and third best by Metacritic. TV Guide named it the best television show of 2012.

Dorothy Rabinowitz of The Wall Street Journal observed that the show is more relevant than ever given recent world events, and proclaimed that "Television's best drama series is, in short, back with all that was delectable about season one on vivid display again—first-class writing, sterling performances, rocketing suspense".

David Wiegand of the San Francisco Chronicle felt that Season 2 delivered on extremely high expectations and maintained the show's level of writing, acting, and tension.

TV Guides Matt Roush praised the "powerhouse performances" by Claire Danes and Damian Lewis, as well as the relentless pace of the writing.

USA Todays Robert Bianco gave the season a 4/4 score, calling it "unmissable TV", and said that even with the expertly crafted plot, Homeland's biggest strength is in its characters.

Brian Lowry of Variety wrote a positive review, noting that there are some plot points that strain plausibility, but that "once the narrative begins hitting its stride in the second episode, it's clear the program remains on a rarefied creative tier".

Awards and nominations
Homeland won three awards at the 70th Golden Globe Awards, including for Best Drama Series, which it won the previous year. Claire Danes and Damian Lewis each won for Best Performance in a Television Series – Drama, with Mandy Patinkin receiving a nomination for Best Supporting Performance in a Series, Miniseries, or Television Film.

At the 19th Screen Actors Guild Awards, the cast was nominated for Best Cast in a Drama Series. Claire Danes and Damian Lewis were also nominated for Best Female Actor and Best Male Actor in a Drama Series respectively. Danes won to claim her second career SAG award.

For the 65th Primetime Emmy Awards, the series received 11 nominations, with two wins. Claire Danes won her second consecutive award for Outstanding Lead Actress in a Drama Series, and Henry Bromell posthumously won for Outstanding Writing for a Drama Series. Nominations included Outstanding Drama Series, Damian Lewis for Outstanding Lead Actor in a Drama Series, Morena Baccarin for Outstanding Supporting Actress in a Drama Series, Mandy Patinkin for Outstanding Supporting Actor in a Drama Series, Rupert Friend for Outstanding Guest Actor in a Drama Series, and Lesli Linka Glatter for Outstanding Directing for a Drama Series for the episode "Q&A". It also received nominations or Outstanding Casting for a Drama Series, Outstanding Sound Mixing for a Comedy or Drama Series (One Hour), and Outstanding Cinematography for a Single-camera Series.

For the 2013 Writers Guild of America Awards, it was nominated for Best Drama Series and Meredith Stiehm received a nomination for Best Episodic Drama for "New Car Smell".

Home media release 
Homeland: The Complete Second Season was released as a widescreen region 1 four-disc DVD and three-disc Blu-ray box set in the United States and Canada on September 10, 2013. In addition to the 12 episodes, it includes deleted scenes and four featurettes—"The Border: Prologue to Season 3", "Return to the Homeland: Filming in Israel", "Damian Lewis: A Personal Video Diary", and "The Choice: The Making of the Season Finale". The same set was also released on September 23, 2013 in region 2.

The season is also available for streaming online via Hulu, as of August 1, 2016.

References

External links 
 
 

2012 American television seasons
2